Émile Martel, OC (born August 10, 1941) is a Canadian diplomat and writer, who won the Governor General's Award for French-language poetry in 1995 for his poetry collection Pour orchestre et poète seul.

Educated at the University of Ottawa, Université Laval and the University of Salamanca, he taught French and Spanish literature in Canada and the United States before joining Canada's Department of External Affairs as a diplomat. He has published both poetry and short stories.

He is the father of Canadian novelist Yann Martel and the brother of Réginald Martel.

Works
Les Enfances brisées (1969)
L'ombre du silence (1974)
Les Gants jetés (1977)
Dictionnaire de cristal
Pour orchestre et poète seul (1995)
English translation by D. G. Jones, For Orchestra and Solo Poet (1996)
 Translation of Life of Pi into French: Histoire de Pi (2003), with Nicole Perron

References

1941 births
Canadian short story writers in French
20th-century Canadian poets
Canadian male poets
Canadian diplomats
People from Amos, Quebec
Canadian poets in French
Writers from Quebec
University of Ottawa alumni
Université Laval alumni
Living people
University of Salamanca alumni
Canadian male short story writers
20th-century Canadian short story writers
Officers of the Order of Canada
20th-century Canadian male writers